The Festival Mundial de la Canción Latina was a televised song contest in 1969 and 1970, hosted in Mexico, which preceded and was succeeded by the Festival OTI de la Canción which ran from 1972 to 2000. The original festival was supported by the Government of Mexico and hosted in the Teatro Ferrocarrilero.

Winners

References

Singing competitions
Song contests